Arivonimamo is a city (commune urbaine) in Itasy Region, in the Central Highlands of Madagascar.

Arivonimamo is connected by the National Road No.1 to Antananarivo (50 km in the east) and Tsiroanomandidy (west). The Antananarivo  international airport was there until replaced by Ivato in 1967. Now it is an airbase.

It borders to the communes of Miarinarivo in the west, Antananarivo and the Analamanga region in the North-east.

Climate

Sports
The soccer club of Arivonimamo is RDN Arivonimamo

See also
Betafo, a fokontany within Arivonimamo.
Vatolaivy

References

Populated places in Itasy Region